Luigi Chinazzo (18 July 1932 – 19 January 2000) was an Italian wrestler. He competed at the 1956 Summer Olympics and the 1960 Summer Olympics.

References

External links
 

1932 births
2000 deaths
Italian male sport wrestlers
Olympic wrestlers of Italy
Wrestlers at the 1956 Summer Olympics
Wrestlers at the 1960 Summer Olympics
Sportspeople from the Province of Treviso
World Wrestling Championships medalists